Eğitim Bilişim Ağı or EBA is an educational content network in Turkey, founded by the Ministry of National Education. The site is designed and run by the Innovation and Educational Technologies General Directorate, which is affiliated with the Ministry. The purpose of the network is the integration of technology to education when required, and the network gives online access to course materials to teachers and students under the FATİH project. Parents and teachers can also access EBA.

Educational material is uploaded to eba.gov.tr categorically, the contents of which have expanded throughout the years. Starting from the second term of the 2019-2020 academic year, it has started offering university exam preparation for 11 and 12th grades. In 20 March 2020, when the COVID-19 pandemic started in Turkey, TRT EBA TV was founded as a collaboration between TRT and EBA for primary, secondary and high schools on three different TV channels to provide students education from home.

References

External links 

 Official site
 Instructions of usage, shared by MEB
 EBA student instructions
 EBA teacher instructions

See also 
 TRT EBA TV

2012 establishments in Turkey
Internet properties established in 2012
Education in Turkey
Educational websites
Educational environment
Educational materials